Mainul Hosein is a Bangladeshi lawyer and the publisher of the daily newspaper The New Nation. He is the former chairman of the editorial board of The Daily Ittefaq, whose building was shelled and completely demolished on 25 March 1971 by Pakistan Army. He served as the law, information and land advisor to the immediate past interim Government of Bangladesh during January 2007 – January 2008.

Background and education
Hosein was born to journalist Tofazzal Hossain Manik Miah. He earned his bachelor's in political science from the University of Dhaka in 1961. He joined Middle Temple to study law. He was called to the Bar in 1965 and became a Barrister-at-Law.

Career 
Hosein was elected to the parliament in 1973 from Pirojpur constituency as a member of Bangladesh Awami League headed by Sheikh Mujibur Rahman,  eventually who became the prime minister. Mainul however, resigned from the parliament along with Muhammad Ataul Goni Osmani, Commander-in-chief of Bangladesh Forces during the 1971 Bangladesh War of Independence, in May 1975 after the then President Sheikh Mujibur Rahman instituted one-party system of government through the Fourth Amendment to the constitution.

Hosein joined the Democratic League party, led by Khondaker Moshtaq Ahmad in 1976 well after Moshtaq was ousted from power on November 6 of 1975. Mainul along with other members of the Democratic League were subsequently jailed for three months by Major General Ziaur Rahman after trying to form an opposition platform to challenge BNP in the upcoming polls.

Hosein served as the president of Bangladesh Sangbadpatra Parishad, an association of newspaper owners. He was elected the president of Bangladesh Supreme Court Bar Association for the term 2000–2001.

Mainul joined the caretaker government as the law, information and land advisor on 14 January 2007.   During his tenure, Bangladesh formally declared the separation of the government's executive and judicial functions on 1 November 2007.

Controversy
In October 2018, Hosein was arrested as part of a political drive against the dissident publisher in a defamation case filed by a third party with a Rangpur court. Earlier Masuda Bhatti, acting editor of Dainik Amader Notun Somoy, filed charges against Husein for hurling abusive words at her and termed her "characterless" at the live talk show, Ekattor Journal, on government backed Ekattor TV. Mainul did get bail in the case filed by Ms. Bhatti but later, his bail petition on cases filed by unrelated parties, a Dhaka Court sent Hosein to jail.

Mainul's lawyers did however manage to get bail subsequently.

The Daily Ittefaq
After the death of Tofazzal Hossain Manik Miah on 1 June 1969, the two sons, Hosein and Anwar Hossain Manju took charge of the management of The Daily Ittefaq.  Bangladesh government banned all the newspapers except the government-run newspapers, the Bangladesh Observer and the Dainik Bangla, via the News Paper Cancellation Act on 16 June 1975. It also took over the publication of The Daily Ittefaq and the Bangladesh Times. Following the assassination of Sheikh Mujib and members of his family in a bloody and brutal coup conducted by few junior active and ex military officers, all private newspapers including The Daily Ittefaq was returned to its owners on 24 August 1975.

In May 2010, an agreement was signed between the two brothers, which gave ownership of Ittefaq's title and goodwill to Manju and his sisters, and Hosein was given the ownership of the building on 1 RK Mission Road. After a High Court ruling in July 2010, Manju became the publisher, printer and editor of the paper.

References 

Living people
University of Dhaka alumni
Members of the Middle Temple
Bangladeshi barristers
Bangladeshi journalists
20th-century Bangladeshi lawyers
21st-century Bangladeshi lawyers
Advisors of Caretaker Government of Bangladesh
Year of birth missing (living people)
Place of birth missing (living people)
1st Jatiya Sangsad members